Radek Štěpánek was the defending champion; however, he lost to Xavier Malisse in the first round.Fernando Verdasco won in the final 3–6, 6–4, 6–4 against Andy Roddick.

Seeds

Draw

Finals

Top half

Bottom half

Qualifying

Seeds

Qualifiers

Lucky loser

Draw

First qualifier

Second qualifier

Third qualifier

Fourth qualifier

References

SAP Open
SAP Open - Singles
2010 SAP Open